Events in the year 1965 in Italy.

Incumbents
President - Giuseppe Saragat
Prime Minister – Aldo Moro

Events
 12 May – The liner  enters service.
 28 December – Foreign Minister Amintore Fanfani resigns, following the publication of an outspoken interview.

Sport

Basketball
1964–65 Serie A (basketball)
1965–66 Serie A (basketball)

Cycling
1965 Giro d'Italia
1965 UCI Road World Championships

Football
1964–65 Serie A
1965–66 Serie A
1964–65 Serie B
1965–66 Serie B

Motor racing
1972 Italian Grand Prix

Births
9 April – Paola Tovaglia, children's television personality (d. 1994)
7 June – Emanuela Pacotto, voice actress 
24 June – Vladimir Luxuria, trans actress, writer, politician and television host
1 July – Oscar Pelliccioli, cyclist and cycling manager
16 July – Gianni Faresin, road bicycle racer

Deaths
13 March
 Corrado Gini, statistician (b. 1884)
 Vittorio Jano, automobile designer (b. 1891)

See also
 1965 in Italian television
 List of Italian films of 1965

References

 
Years of the 20th century in Italy
1960s in Italy
Italy
Italy